Stefan LeFors (born June 7, 1981) is a former quarterback in American and Canadian football who is currently a high school coach. He was originally drafted by the Carolina Panthers in the fourth round (121st overall) of the 2005 NFL Draft. He played collegiately at Louisville.

College career
In 2003, LeFors became the starting quarterback for the Louisville Cardinals football team. In 2004, LeFors started every game that season. LeFors ranks as the 4th all-time leading passer at the University of Louisville with 5,853 yards & first in pass completion percentage with 66%. In 2004, he narrowly missed breaking Daunte Culpepper's season-record completion percentage with 73.5 to Culpepper's 73.6. He led Louisville that season to an 11-1 season in which they finished 6th in the final AP Poll (the highest finish in school history) and won the Liberty Bowl. Louisville was the only D-1A (now FBS) university to recruit LeFors out of high school as a quarterback. LeFors was redshirted as a freshman in 2000 and served as a backup to Dave Ragone in 2001 and 2002. In 2003, he took over as a starter, throwing for 3,145 passing yards and 17 touchdowns, and was named 1st team All-Conference USA Quarterback in both 2003 and 2004. He was also named Conference Player of the Year in 2004 and named a finalist for the Johnny Unitas Golden Arm Award as a senior. LeFors participated in the East–West Shrine Game (college all-stars) and was named Offensive Player of the Game.

Professional career

LeFors was selected by the Carolina Panthers in the fourth round (121st overall pick) of the 2005 NFL Draft out of the University of Louisville. After serving one season in a backup role, he was released by the Panthers in September 2006. LeFors conducted workouts for the Tampa Bay Buccaneers, Minnesota Vikings, Seattle Seahawks, Buffalo Bills, Detroit Lions, Oakland Raiders, and Denver Broncos but was not offered a contract. In December 2006, LeFors was signed by the Edmonton Eskimos of the CFL as an import player. He was the backup quarterback for the team's 2007 season, but had the opportunity to start 5 games at the end of the season because of Ricky Ray's shoulder injury. By the end of the 2007 CFL regular season, LeFors was placed 8th in the league in passing yardage with 1193 yards, as well as 6 touchdowns and 8 interceptions, while completing 60.8% of his passes. He was 7th in quarterback rushing yardage with 204 yards and 2 touchdowns. His best performance of the season came in week 18 against Saskatchewan. In a losing effort, he managed to complete 34/48 passes for 412 yards 3 touchdowns and 1 interceptions, while scrambling 6 times for 31 yards. According to head coach Danny Maciocia, LeFors shares the job as 2nd string quarterback on the Eskimo depth chart for the 2008 campaign with Jason Maas.

On January 21, 2009, LeFors was traded to the Winnipeg Blue Bombers for a second-round pick in the 2009 CFL draft and a conditional selection in 2010. Then on June 18, 2009 LeFors was named Winnipeg's starting quarterback for the start of the 2009 season. In the offseason preceding the 2010 CFL season, LeFors retired from the CFL.

Post-playing career
LeFors returned to Louisville and took a position with the U of L athletic department, also serving as a color analyst for the U of L radio network during the 2010 football season. In May 2011, he was named the new head football coach at Christian Academy of Louisville., He has led the Centurions to the Kentucky Class AA title in 2016 and 2018.  In 8 seasons, his career record as a head coach is 86-20. As of 2019, he is now head coach at Parkview Baptist High School in Baton Rouge, Louisiana.

Personal life
LeFors is a child of deaf adults; his parents (Larry and Susan), as well as his brother Eric, are deaf. As a result, LeFors is fluent in American sign language. LeFors and his wife, Joy, have two children (Luke and Ella).

See also
 List of NCAA major college football yearly passing leaders

References

External links

 
 ESPN.com college profile

 

1981 births
Living people
American football quarterbacks
American players of Canadian football
Canadian football quarterbacks
Carolina Panthers players
Edmonton Elks players
Louisville Cardinals football players
Winnipeg Blue Bombers players
High school football coaches in Kentucky
Players of American football from Baton Rouge, Louisiana
Cajun sportspeople